|}
{| class="collapsible collapsed" cellpadding="0" cellspacing="0" style="clear:right; float:right; text-align:center; font-weight:bold;" width="280px"
! colspan="3" style="border:1px solid black; background-color: #77DD77;" | Also Ran

The 1989 Epsom Derby was a horse race which took place at Epsom Downs on Wednesday 7 June 1989. It was the 210th running of the Derby, and it was won by the pre-race favourite Nashwan. The winner was ridden by Willie Carson and trained by Dick Hern.

Race details
 Sponsor: Ever Ready
 Winner's prize money: £296,000
 Going: Good
 Number of runners: 12
 Winner's time: 2m 34.90s

Full result

* The distances between the horses are shown in lengths or shorter. hd = head.† Trainers are based in Great Britain unless indicated.

Winner's details
Further details of the winner, Nashwan:

 Foaled: March 1, 1986, in Kentucky, USA
 Sire: Blushing Groom; Dam: Height of Fashion (Bustino)
 Owner: Hamdan Al Maktoum
 Breeder: Hamdan Al Maktoum
 Rating in 1989 International Classifications: 131

Form analysis

Two-year-old races
Notable runs by the future Derby participants as two-year-olds in 1988.

 Nashwan – 1st Autumn Stakes
 Terimon – 4th Washington Singer Stakes, 6th Middle Park Stakes
 Cacoethes – 3rd Autumn Stakes
 Gran Alba – 5th Horris Hill Stakes, 3rd Burr Stakes
 Classic Fame – 1st National Stakes, 1st Beresford Stakes
 Prince of Dance – 1st Champagne Stakes, 1st Dewhurst Stakes (dead-heat)
 Polar Run – 2nd Solario Stakes, 4th Futurity Stakes

The road to Epsom
Early-season appearances in 1989 and trial races prior to running in the Derby.

 Nashwan – 1st 2,000 Guineas
 Terimon – 2nd Thirsk Classic Trial
 Cacoethes – 1st Lingfield Derby Trial
 Gran Alba – 4th Predominate Stakes
 Classic Fame – 5th Irish 2,000 Guineas
 Torjoun – 1st Dante Stakes
 Flockton's Own – 6th Dante Stakes
 Prince of Dance – 1st Newmarket Stakes
 Warrshan – 3rd Chester Vase, 1st Predominate Stakes
 Polar Run – 2nd Warren Stakes

Subsequent Group 1 wins
Group 1 / Grade I victories after running in the Derby.

 Nashwan – Eclipse Stakes (1989), King George VI and Queen Elizabeth Stakes (1989)
 Terimon – International Stakes (1991)
 Cacoethes – Turf Classic (1990)
 Gran Alba – Christmas Hurdle (1991)

Subsequent breeding careers
Leading progeny of participants in the 1989 Epsom Derby.

Sires of Group/Grade One winners
Nashwan (1st)
 Swain - Champion Older Horse (1998)
 Bago - Champion Three-year-old Colt (2004)
 Aqaarid - 2nd 1000 Guineas Stakes (1995)
 One So Wonderful - 1st International Stakes (1998)

Sires of National Hunt horses
Terimon (2nd)
 Scots Grey - 3rd Mildmay of Flete Challenge Cup (2003)
 Roman Ark - 1st Rossington Main Novices' Hurdle (2005)
 Dusty Too - Dam of Simonsig
 Third Party - Dam of Countrywide Flame (1st Fighting Fifth Hurdle 2012), (1st Triumph Hurdle 2012)

Other Stallions
Warrshan (11th) - Fleet Hill (1st Superlative Stakes 1994 - Dam of dual G3 winner African Dream)Mill Pond (5th) - Exported to Czech Republic - Kedon (3rd Velká pardubická 2002), Valldemoso (3rd Velká pardubická 2011)Classic Fame (7th) - Exported to New Zealand - Power And Fame (3rd New Zealand 2000 Guineas 1998)Gran Alba (6th) - Minor jumps winnersCacoethes (3rd) - Exported to JapanIle de Nisky (4th) - Exported to Saudi ArabiaTorjoun (8th) - Exported to ChileFlockton's Own (9th) - Sired minor winnerPolar Run (12th) - Exported to Saudi Arabia

References

External links
 Colour Chart – Derby 1989

Epsom Derby
 1989
1989 in British sport
Epsom Derby
20th century in Surrey